The first 1831 Massachusetts gubernatorial election was held on April 14.

National Republican Governor Levi Lincoln Jr. was re-elected to a seventh term in office over Democrat Marcus Morton. Lincoln was elected to a reduced term of eight months expiring in January, instead of the typical year-long term ending in May.

General election

Candidates
Heman Lincoln (Anti-Masonic)
Levi Lincoln Jr., incumbent Governor since 1825 (National Republican)
Marcus Morton, Associate Justice of the Supreme Judicial Court, former acting Governor and nominee since 1828 (Democratic)
Henry Shaw, former U.S. Representative from Lanesborough (Independent)

Campaign
Though the newly established Anti-Masonic Party was not strong enough to nominate a governor, Heman Lincoln and Henry Shaw both ran as independents appealing to Anti-Masonic voters.

Results
The two Anti-Masons carried twenty-eight towns in the central part of the state; Democrats lost ground.

See also
 1830–1831 Massachusetts legislature

References

Governor
1831
Massachusetts
April 1831 events